John Payn (fl. 1391) of Swaffham Prior, Cambridgeshire, was an English politician, lawyer and landowner.

He was a Member (MP) of the Parliament of England for Cambridge in 1391.

References

Year of birth missing
Year of death missing
English MPs 1391
14th-century English lawyers
People from East Cambridgeshire District